Rayan Poltronieri Pereira, commonly known as Rayan is a Brazilian footballer who plays as a centre-back for Criciúma.

Career
He made his national league debut for Icasa in 2011 Campeonato Brasileiro Série B, against Duque de Caxias on 20 July 2011. He has also represented Paraná in 2018 Campeonato Brasileiro Série A and 2017 Campeonato Brasileiro Série B, ASA in 2016 Campeonato Brasileiro Série C and Santo André in 2013 Campeonato Brasileiro Série D.

References

External links
 

Living people
1989 births
Brazilian footballers
Association football defenders
Associação Desportiva São Caetano players
Mirassol Futebol Clube players
Batatais Futebol Clube players
Red Bull Brasil players
Campinense Clube players
Associação Desportiva Recreativa e Cultural Icasa players
Rio Claro Futebol Clube players
São José Esporte Clube players
Esporte Clube Santo André players
São Bernardo Futebol Clube players
Agremiação Sportiva Arapiraquense players
Paraná Clube players
Associação Ferroviária de Esportes players
Red Bull Bragantino players
Associação Atlética Ponte Preta players
Criciúma Esporte Clube players
Campeonato Brasileiro Série A players
Campeonato Brasileiro Série B players
Campeonato Brasileiro Série C players
Campeonato Brasileiro Série D players